Tranemo is a locality and the seat of Tranemo Municipality, Västra Götaland County, Sweden with 3,168 inhabitants in 2010.

References 

Populated places in Västra Götaland County
Populated places in Tranemo Municipality
Municipal seats of Västra Götaland County
Swedish municipal seats